Metopocampta planiceps is a species of ulidiid or picture-winged fly in the genus Metopocampta of the family Ulidiidae.

References

Ulidiidae